The Line-Up is a 1934 American crime film directed by Howard Higgin and starring William Gargan, Marian Nixon and Paul Hurst.

Synopsis
A young police officer is assigned to the detective squad investigating a series of thefts of fur coats. A woman working as a hat check girl in a hotel comes under suspicion of working with the gang, but he sets out to prove her innocence and track down the real culprits.

Cast

References

Bibliography
 Langman, Larry & Finn, Daniel. A Guide to American Crime Films of the Thirties. Greenwood Press, 1995.

External links
 

1934 films
1934 crime films
American crime films
Films directed by Howard Higgin
Columbia Pictures films
1930s English-language films
1930s American films